Marthasterias is a genus of starfish in the family Asteriidae. It is monotypic and the only species in the genus is Marthasterias glacialis, commonly known as the spiny starfish. It is native to the eastern Atlantic Ocean.

Description

Marthasterias glacialis is a fairly large starfish with a small central disc and five slender, tapering arms. Each arm has three longitudinal rows of conical, whitish spines, usually with purple tips, each surrounded by a wreath of pedicellariae. The background colour is variable and may be brownish or greenish-grey, tinged with yellow or red and sometimes with purple at the tips of the arms. It is sometimes confused with the northern starfish Leptasterias muelleri.

Distribution and habitat
Marthasterias glacialis is native to the Eastern Atlantic Ocean (from Iceland and Macaronesia in the North Atlantic to Angola and South Africa in the South Atlantic), and the Baltic and Mediterranean seas. Around the British Isles it is limited to the western side of Scotland, Wales, the western part of southern England and most of Ireland.

Ecology

Like other starfish in the family Asteriidae, Marthasterias glacialis is a predator and feeds mostly on bivalve molluscs and other invertebrates. It has been found that secondary metabolites known as saponins, found within the starfish's tissues, have a dramatic effect on the whelk Buccinum undatum. At low concentrations they cause the mollusc to withdraw from the vicinity of the starfish and at higher concentrations they cause convulsions in the mollusc's musculature. The sea urchins Strongylocentrotus droebachiensis and Psammechinus miliaris are also affected by the chemicals. S. droebachiensis flees but P. miliaris has toxic pedicellariae and is able to defend itself.

The reproductive biology of this starfish has been little studied but off the coast of Ireland, individuals gather together in very shallow water in July and August. A few days later, on a warm afternoon, they have been observed to arch their bodies and release spawn into the sea. A rise in the water temperature seems to have triggered the spawning.

References

External links
 

Asteriidae
Monotypic echinoderm genera
Fauna of the Atlantic Ocean
Fauna of the Mediterranean Sea